Elder Grigorije (1310–55) was a Serbian Orthodox clergyman and writer. Grigorije hailed from the Prizren region, and was a nobleman in the Serbian Empire until he took monastic vows and received the monastic title of elder (starac). Together with monk Jakov of Serres he led the building of the Monastery of the Holy Archangels in Prizren, the endowment of Emperor Stefan Dušan (r. 1331–55), and became the first hegumen. Grigorije and monk Teodosije of Hilandar together left Mount Athos for Serbia where they would write the „Žitije svetog Petra Koriškog“, as well as songs and services for the Saint. It is thought that he was one of the protégés of Gregory of Sinai, and there exists indications that he is the so-called "Danilo's pupil" (Danilov učenik), i.e. the main author of the great work Žitija kraljeva i arhiepiskopa srpskih, which was started by Archbishop Danilo II (s. 1324–37).

See also
Teodosije the Hilandarian (1246-1328), one of the most important Serbian writers in the Middle Ages
Antonije Bagaš (fl. 1356-1366), bought and restored the Agiou Pavlou monastery
Lazar the Hilandarian (fl. 1404), the first known Serbian and Russian watchmaker
Pachomius the Serb (fl. 1440s-1484), hagiographer of the Russian Church
 Miroslav Gospel
 Gabriel the Hilandarian
 Elder Siluan
 Constantine of Kostenets
 Cyprian, Metropolitan of Kiev and All Rus'
 Gregory Tsamblak
 Isaija the Monk
 Grigorije of Gornjak
 Atanasije (scribe)
 Rajčin Sudić
 Jakov of Serres
 Romylos of Vidin
 Nicodemus of Tismana
 Dimitar of Kratovo
 Marko Pećki

References
 S. Novaković: Narodna tradicija i kritička istorija, Otadžbina 1880, knj. V, br. 17;
 I. Pavlović: Književni radovi arhiepiskopa Danila II, Beograd 1888:
 Lj. Stojanović: Žitija kraljeva i arhiepiskopa srpskih i od arhiepiskopa Danila i drugih Glas SA, 1923, CVI;
 N. Radojčić: O arhiepiskopu Danila II i njegovim nastavljačima (predgovor prevodu L. Mirkovića: Život kraljeva i arhiepiskopa srpskih). Beograd 1935, str. V—XXIX;
 M. Kašanin: Danilov nastavljač, Srska književnost u srednjem veku, Beograd 1975, str. 234—252

14th-century Serbian writers
Medieval Serbian Orthodox clergy
People from Prizren
People of the Serbian Empire
Kosovo Serbs
Medieval European scribes
14th-century Eastern Orthodox clergy
14th-century Christian monks
Serbian monks
Serbian abbots
People associated with Hilandar Monastery